The 55th Bodil Awards  were held on 3 March 2002 in the Imperial Cinema in Copenhagen, Denmark, honouring the best national and foreign films of 2001. Søren Østergaard and Louise Mieritz hosted the event which was broadcast live on DR2. Ole Christian Madsen's Kira's Reason: A Love Story won the awards for Best Film and Best Actress in a Leading Role (Stine Stengade). Jens Oking and Susanne Juhasz, both from One-Hand Clapping, won the awards for Best Leading Actor and Best Supporting Actress respectively, and Tommy Kenter in Fukssvansen received the Best Supporting Actor award. The Lord of the Rings: The Fellowship of the Ring was named Best American Film and Swedish Songs from the Second Floor Best Non-American Film.

Morten Piil and Peter Schepelern both received a Bodil Special Award for their contribution to increasing the knowledge of and interest in Danish film. Piil is a film critic for Dagbladet Information and Schepelern a scholar from University of Copenhagen, Institute for Film and Media Sciences, and both have edited large encyclopaedic works. Dan Laustsen was honoured with the Johan Ankerstjernes Award for Cinematography.

Winners and nominees 

Winners and nominees:

Best Danish Film

Kira's Reason: A Love Story
 A Song for Martin
 Family
 One-Hand Clapping 
 Truly Human

Best Actor in a Leading Role

Jens Okking – One-Hand Clapping
 Lars Mikkelsen – Kira's Reason: A Love Story
 Troels Lyby – Truly Human
 Nikolaj Lie Kaas – Truly Human
 Sven Wollter – A Song for Martin

Best Actress in a Leading Role

Stine Stengade – Kira's Reason: A Love Story
 Sidse Babett Knudsen – Mona's World
 Charlotte Munck – Hush Little Baby
 Viveka Seldahl – A Song for Martin

Best Actor in a Supporting Role

Tommy Kenter – Fukssvansen
 Troels II Munk – Truly Human

Best Actress in a Supporting Role

Susanne Juhasz – One-Hand Clapping
 Birthe Neumann – Fukssvansen

Best American Film

The Lord of the Rings: The Fellowship of the Ring 
 Traffic
 Shrek
 You Can Count on Me
 The Pledge

Best Non-American Film

Songs from the Second Floor
 In the Mood for Love
 Love is a Bitch
 The Circle
 Moulin Rouge

Bodil Special Award
 Morten Piil and Peter Schepelern

Johan Ankerstjerne Award for Cinematography
Dan Laustsen

See also 

 2002 Robert Awards

References 

2001 film awards
Bodil Awards ceremonies
2002 in Copenhagen
March 2002 events in Europe